Musics may refer to:
Musics (album), an album by Dewey Redman
Musics (magazine), a magazine covering free improvised music

See also
 Music (disambiguation)
 S Musics